The Voltarol Years is the fifteenth album by Wirral-based rock band Half Man Half Biscuit, released on 25 February 2022 on the band's own R. M. Qualtrough label. It is their first album release since Probe Plus founder Geoff Davies announced his retirement and the shuttering of the label.

Track listing

Charts

References

External links 
 

2022 albums
Half Man Half Biscuit albums